Baliakheri railway station is a railway station on Moradabad–Ambala line under the Moradabad railway division of Northern Railway zone. This is situated at Baliakheri in Saharanpur district of the Indian state of Uttar Pradesh.

References

Railway stations in Saharanpur district
Moradabad railway division